SZS may refer to:
Ryan's Creek Aerodrome, Stewart Island, New Zealand (IATA: SZS)
Scandinavian Airlines Ireland (ICAO callsign: SZS)
Schulzentrum Saterland, general education day school in Lower Saxony, Germany
Shizuoka City, Shizuoka Prefecture (location code used in vehicle registration plates of Japan)
Slovak Green Party, environmentalist political party in Slovakia
Solomon Islands Sign Language (ISO 639-3: szs) 
Alliance for Serbia, political coalition in Serbia

Creative works
Sayonara, Zetsubou-Sensei, 2005–2012 Japanese manga series
Senki Zesshō Symphogear, 2012 Japanese anime

See also
Sz (disambiguation)